East St. John High School is a high school in Reserve, an unincorporated area in St. John the Baptist Parish, Louisiana, United States. The school is a part of St. John the Baptist Parish Public Schools. As of 2013–2014, the school had 1,327 students.

History
East St. John opened for the 1978–79 school year. The students had previously attended the second Leon Godchaux High School located in Reserve, Louisiana that first opened in 1930. The original Leon Godchaux High School was also located in Reserve, Louisiana and both Leon Godchaux campuses were also referred to as "Reserve High School". 

Fifth Ward High School was an all-black secondary school located in Reserve that opened in 1950. After the school closed in 1969, its students moved to Leon Godchaux High School.

Extracurricular activities
4-H
Beta
Cheerleaders
Fellowship of Christian Athletes
Flag Team
Future Business Leaders of America
Gamers Club
HOSA - Health Occupations Student Association - First Responders, Pharmacy Tech,
Interact Club
JAG - Jobs for America's Graduates
Majorettes
Marching Wildcats
NOCCA
ProStart
Student Council
Sugarettes
T - Tap Talented Theatre
TSA - Technology Student Association
V-TAP - Visual and Talented Arts
Welding

Athletics
East St. John High athletics competes in the LHSAA.

Basketball - Boys
Basketball - Girls
Cross Country
Football
Golf
Power Lifting
Soccer - Boys
Soccer - Girls
Softball
Track - Boys
Track - Girls
Volleyball

State Championships
East St. John
Football: 1980

Leon Godchaux
Football: 1958 

 Joe Keller - LHSAA Hall of Fame head football coach, Joe Keller, was head coach at Leon Godchaux from 1934 to 1970. During his thirty-eight seasons at the school, he compiled a 262–73–15 record and won fifteen district championships and a state championship in 1958. The East St. John football stadium is named after Keller.

Notable alumni
Patrick Lewis, offensive lineman for the Seattle Seahawks
Louis Lipps, wide receiver for the Pittsburgh Steelers and New Orleans Saints
Ryan Perrilloux, quarterback for Louisiana State University, Jacksonville State and New York Giants
DeQuincy Scott, defensive lineman for the San Diego Chargers and Tennessee Titans
Duke Williams, wide receiver for the Canadian Football League
Gerald Williams, Major League Baseball outfielder
Roydell Williams wide receiver for the Tennessee Titans and Washington Redskins

References

External links

East St. John High School website

Public high schools in Louisiana
Schools in St. John the Baptist Parish, Louisiana
1976 establishments in Louisiana
Educational institutions established in 1976